Giovanni Stefano Robatto (1649–1733) was an Italian painter of the Baroque period. He was born at Savona. He studied at Rome under Carlo Maratti. He was employed painting for churches in Genoa, among his works, a St. Francis receiving the Stigmata for the church of the Cappucini. He afterwards abandoned himself to a fatal passion for gaming, and his later works are hasty and careless.

References

17th-century Italian painters
Italian male painters
18th-century Italian painters
Italian Baroque painters
Painters from Genoa
1649 births
1733 deaths
Pupils of Carlo Maratta
18th-century Italian male artists